Sir Ross Mahon, 1st Baronet (1763–1835), of Castlegar, Co. Galway, was an Irish Member of Parliament for Ennis in 1820.

References

1763 births
1835 deaths
Mahon, Sir Ross, 1st Baronet
Members of the Parliament of the United Kingdom for County Clare constituencies (1801–1922)